49 Degrees North Ski Area is a ski resort in the northwestern United States, located inside Colville National Forest in Stevens County, Washington,  east of Chewelah, which is  north of Spokane.

Its slopes are primarily north-facing and are served by six chairlifts - one quad, one high-speed detachable quad, and four doubles.

The ski area first opened in late 1972 with three chairlifts. Following two consecutive winters of poor weather, the ski area filed for Chapter 11 bankruptcy in June 1990.

Six years later in June 1996, John Eminger, a local, purchased the ski area and acted as owner operator for the next 23 years. In the 1990s, the trees were thinned over most of its , providing some of the greatest variation and magnitude of tree skiing found at a single resort in the northwest United States. The resort will soon be implementing mountain biking.

It was served by a double chair that vertically climbed . It began operation with a rope tow in 1936; the double chairlift was added in 1950, and a lodge in 1952.

In the spring of 2019, the ski area was sold to CMR Lands LLC, headed by Seattle-area businessman Tryg Fortun. The group also owns Silver Mountain in Kellogg, Idaho, purchased three years earlier in 2016. In 2021, the resort installed a base to summit high speed detachable quad chairlift. Northern Spirit, built by Doppelmayr USA, is the newest, longest, and most powerful chairlift in the State of Washington and the Inland Northwest, surpassed only by Crystal Mountain and Silver Mountain's Gondolas.

References

External links 

[1]
[2] Mountain Webcam
Ski Map.org – trail maps – 49 Degrees North ski area

Ski areas and resorts in Washington (state)
Buildings and structures in Stevens County, Washington
Tourist attractions in Stevens County, Washington